New Gods is the second album by indie rock musician Withered Hand, released on 10 March 2014. It features appearances from Pam Berry of Black Tambourine, as well as Eugene Kelly, Scott Hutchison and members of Belle and Sebastian and King Creosote. It was funded in part by Creative Scotland.

In 2022, a remastered version of the album was released digitally on Reveal Records, with two bonus demo tracks. It replaced the original version on Bandcamp.

Reception
On the website Metacritic, which aggregates scores from reviews by well-known critics, the album has a score of 71%, indicating generally favourable reviews. The Quietus Nicola Meighan described it as "wise, but never preaching" and wrote that while Withered Hand's debut album Good News discussed mainly Christianity-related topics, New Gods focuses more on "more fiery celestial deities – namely the sun and the stars in the sky".

Accolades
New Gods was nominated for the Association of Independent Music's "Best Difficult Second Album" Award, but lost to Ben Watt's album Hendra. Robert Christgau named it the third best album of 2014 in his year-end list for The Barnes & Noble Review.

Track listing
Horseshoe
Black Tambourine
Love Over Desire
King of Hollywood
California
Fall Apart
Between True Love and Ruin
Life of Doubt
New Gods
Heart Heart
Not Alone
Horseshoe Demo (2022 Remaster)
California Demo (2022 Remaster)

References

External links
 

2014 albums
Withered Hand albums
Albums produced by Tony Doogan
Slumberland Records albums
Fortuna Pop! Records albums